Rodney Sheppard (born November 25, 1967) is an American musician who is the guitarist of the rock band Sugar Ray.

Life and career

Rodney was born in Port Of Spain, but raised in Newport Beach, California. His mother's name is Gloria and he has an older brother named Alan. While attending Corona del Mar High School Rodney & friends formed a cover band inspired by the group The Jam. That band, initially called The Tories, went on to become The Shrinky Dinx, and eventually became Sugar Ray.

On New Year's Eve 1998 Rodney proposed to girlfriend of 9 years- Gretchen Fyke. The couple married in Newport Beach, California on June 6, 1998. They have two children: Campbell Lee (born 2000) and Charlotte Anne (born 2002).

Campbell's middle name is an homage to action star Bruce Lee. Rodney's admiration for the actor, and the entire Kung Fu genre, can be seen in his role in the video for Sugar Ray's "When It's Over" where he attempts karate with Kareem Abdul-Jabbar.
 
Rodney's bulldog Austin (1993–2006), made a cameo appearance in almost every Sugar Ray video and can be seen in the inside sleeve of the 2001 Sugar Ray self-titled album.

With the band, Rodney has appeared in the films Scooby-Doo and Father's Day, as well as the TV show Las Vegas.

References

External links
Official Sugar Ray site

1967 births
American male actors
American male singers
American rock guitarists
American male guitarists
Living people
Trinidad and Tobago emigrants to the United States
Trinidad and Tobago people of European descent
Sugar Ray members
20th-century American guitarists
20th-century American male musicians